Utetheisa lotrix, the salt-and-pepper moth or crotalaria moth, is a moth of the family Erebidae. The species was first described by Pieter Cramer in 1777. It is found in most of the Old World tropics.

The wingspan is about 30 mm.

The larvae feed on Crotalaria species.

Subspecies
Utetheisa lotrix lotrix (Cramer, [1777]) – southern Iran, Pakistan, India, Seychelles, Sri-Lanka, China, Japan, New Guinea, Australia, New Zealand
Utetheisa lotrix stigmata Rothschild, 1910 – Loyalty Islands, New Caledonia, New Hebrides, Fiji, Solomons, Samoa, Tonga, Niue
Utetheisa lotrix lepida (Rambur, [1866]) – Madagascar, Réunion
Utetheisa lotrix socotrensis Jordan, 1939 – Socotra Island

References

lotrix
Moths of Africa
Moths of Asia
Moths of Oceania
Insects of Southeast Asia
Moths of Australia
Moths of Indonesia
Moths of Japan
Moths of Madagascar
Moths of Malaysia
Moths of New Zealand
Moths of Sri Lanka
Moths of Réunion
Moths of the Middle East
Moths of Seychelles
Moths of the Arabian Peninsula
Moths described in 1777